Morton Allport FLS (4 December 1830 – 10 September 1878) was an English-born Australian colonial naturalist.

Allport was born to Joseph and Mary Morton Allport, at West Bromwich, Staffordshire. His family moved in 1831 to Tasmania. He trained for law, his father's profession, and was admitted as a solicitor of the Supreme Court of Tasmania in 1852.

Allport was an ardent and accomplished naturalist, and by his original work added largely to the knowledge of the zoology and botany of Tasmania. To the study of the fishes of the colony he gave special attention, and he made it his concern to send specimens of every new fish he could procure to the best authorities of England and elsewhere. He was an authority on Tasmanian fish and catalogued, described and drew pictures of his specimens. He was a leader in the introduction of salmon and trout to Tasmanian waters and also introduced the white water-lily and the perch.

Allport was a Fellow of the Linnæan Society of London and of the Zoological Society, corresponding member of the Anthropological Institute, life member of the Entomological and Malacological Societies, and foreign member of several Continental scientific societies. He was a vice-president of the Royal Society of Tasmania, to the Proceedings of which last-named Society he contributed a number of valuable pacers on the subjects of his favourite studies. He was a member of the Council of Education for many years. He died at Hobart on 10 September 1878.

References

Australian naturalists
Animal artists
1830 births
1878 deaths
19th-century Australian painters
19th-century Australian male artists
Australian solicitors
British emigrants to Australia
Australian male painters